Mutufu is a town in Sironko District in the Eastern Region of Uganda.

Sironko District
Populated places in Eastern Region, Uganda